Dr. Modadugu Vijay Gupta (17 August 1939) is an Indian biologist and fisheries scientist. He was awarded the  World Food Prize in 2005, for development and dissemination of low-cost techniques for freshwater fish farming (using tilapia species) by the rural poor. He is considered a pioneer in the blue revolution of Southeast Asia. In 2015, was selected for the first Sunhak Peace Prize, in recognition of his creating an aquaculture system for the poor, rural populations in Asia, Africa and the Pacific.

In 2023, he was awarded Padma Shri by the Government of India.

Early life and career
Born on 17 August 1939, Modadugu hails from Bapatla in the State of Andhra Pradesh, India.

Till his recent retirement, Dr. Modadugu served as the Assistant Director General at WorldFish, an international fisheries research institute under the Consultative Group on International Agricultural Research (CGIAR) based at Penang in Malaysia.

References

Living people
20th-century Indian biologists
People from Guntur district
1939 births
Scientists from Andhra Pradesh
Aquaculture in India
Agriculture and food award winners
Recipients of the Padma Shri in science & engineering